Clepsis rogana is a species of moth of the family Tortricidae. It is found in Spain, France, Germany, Austria, Switzerland, Italy, the Czech Republic, Slovakia, Poland, Romania, Russia, Finland, Estonia and the Near East.

The wingspan is 20–22 mm. Adults have been recorded on wing from June to August.

The larvae are polyphagous and have been recorded feeding on Vaccinium and Luzula species, as well as Veratrum album. They feed between the rolled leaves of their host plant.

See also
 Lists of Lepidoptera by region

References

Moths described in 1845
Clepsis